Yvonne Ann Blake (17 April 1940 – 17 July 2018) was a British-Spanish costume designer. She won an Academy Award for Best Costume Design for the film Nicholas and Alexandra along with Antonio Castillo. She won four Goya Awards and was nominated for BAFTA Awards and the Emmy Awards as well.

On 14 July 2016 she took the Presidency of the Academy of Cinematographic Arts and Sciences of Spain. On 9 June 2018 Mariano Barroso replaced her in the Presidency due to her health problems. Blake died in Madrid on 17 July 2018 at age 78 from complications from a stroke.

Accolades

Academy Awards

BAFTA Awards

Goya Awards

Honours 
 Gold Medal of Merit in Labour (Kingdom of Spain, 14 November 2011).
 National Cinematography Prize (Kingdom of Spain, 17 September 2012).

See also
 List of Spanish Academy Award winners and nominees

References

External links

 

1940 births
2018 deaths
British costume designers
Women costume designers
Best Costume Design Academy Award winners
Goya Award winners
Designers from Greater Manchester
English emigrants to Spain